Boettgerilla is a genus of air-breathing land slugs, terrestrial pulmonate gastropod molluscs in the family Boettgerillidae.

The generic name Boettgerilla is named after the German malacologist Oskar Boettger.

Taxonomy 
Boettgerilla is the only genus in the family Boettgerillidae. This family has no subfamilies (according to the taxonomy of the Gastropoda by Bouchet & Rocroi, 2005).

Boettgerillidae Van Goethem, 1972 is not an available name, because it has no diagnosis.

Distribution 
Distribution of Boettgerillidae include western Palearctic.

Species 
There are two species in the genus Boettgerilla and they include:
 Boettgerilla compressa Simroth, 1910 - type species
 Boettgerilla pallens Simroth, 1912

Cladogram 
A cladogram showing the phylogenic relationships of this family to other families within the limacoid clade:

See also 
This genus of slugs should not be confused with a genus of door snails that has a similar name: Boettgeria. Both genera were named in honor of Caesar Rudolf Boettger.

References

Further reading 
  Schmid G. (1963). "Zur Verbreitung und Anatomie der Gattung Boettgerilla". Archiv für Molluskenkunde 92: 215-225.

External links 

 British Non-marine Molluscs: Families

Boettgerillidae
Gastropod genera